Black Township is one of ten townships in Posey County, Indiana. As of the 2000 census, its population was 10,288. The township is the largest both in terms of area and population in Posey County.

History
Black Township was organized in 1817. The township was named for the Black family of pioneer settlers.

The Frederick and Augusta Hagemann Farm, Mann site, and Mount Vernon site are listed on the National Register of Historic Places.

Adjacent Townships
 Indiana
 Posey County
 Lynn Township (North)
 Marrs Township (East)
 Point Township (Southwest)
 Robinson Township (Single Point)
 Illinois
 White County
 Emma Township (West)
 Kentucky
 Henderson County
 Corydon District (Southeast)
 Union County
 Uniontown District (South Central)

Cities
Mount Vernon

Unincorporated places
Bufkin
Dead Mans Crossing
Erwin
Farmersville
Grafton
Prairie
Upton
Welborn Switch

References

External links
 Indiana Township Association
 United Township Association of Indiana

Townships in Posey County, Indiana
Townships in Indiana